The Sultanate of Oman has had a relatively long history of football clubs dating back to the 1940s.  The oldest club still surviving to date in the Sultanate is Oman Club which was established in 1942. Many clubs have also experienced mergers such as Muscat, and Seeb. There are currently 43 clubs known to Oman.

Dhofar is known as the most successful club in Omani football earning them the nickname, "Al-Zaeem, or "The Leaders" due to them holding 10 Omani League titles; the most won by a club, and winning 7 Sultan Qaboos Cups, as well as reaching the final of the Gulf Club Champions Cup once in 1996 losing to Saudi club Al-Nassr. Fanja has also had a successful title history with 9 Omani League titles to their name, 9 Sultan Qaboos Cups to their name; the most ever won by a club, and also winning in 1989 the Gulf Club Championship making them the only omani club to win internationally, despite having a successful history, Fanja has been in a downfall since the 1990s, but regained their form in the 2010s winning a number of titles most notably their ninth Sultan Qaboos Cup only to once again lose form in the 2020s after the covid pandemic.

Evolution to a Professional League
Although being very popular in the local community, it is ranked according to the AFC as a Class D football League.  Sayyid Khalid bin Hamid, OFA President, has announced his organization's plan to transform the Omani Football League into a professional league by the year 2012, and will change its name to the "Oman Mobile League."  Many companies such as Nissan, Shell, and Oman Mobile, are one of the main reasons why the league is expected to transform, along with the leadership of Sayyid Khalid.

2014–15 Oman Professional League teams

{| class="wikitable" style="text-align: left;"
|-
! Club
! Home city
! Manager
! Stadium
! Capacity
|-
| Al-Khabourah
| Al-Khabourah
|  Sherif El-Khashab
| Nizwa Sports Complex
| 10,000
|-
| Al-Musannah
| Al-Musannah
|  Musabah Al-Saadi (Feb 2015–)
| Al-Seeb Stadium
| 14,000
|-
| Al-Nahda
| Al-Buraimi
|  Bernardo Tavares (Feb 2015–)
| Al-Buraimi Sports Complex
| 10,000
|-
| Al-Nasr
| Salalah
|  Edo Flego (Mar 2015–)
| Al-Saada Stadium / Salalah Sports Complex
| 12,000 / 8,000
|-
| Assassins.F.C
| Muscat
|   (Oct 2018–)
| Al Wadi Sports Complex
| 8,000
|-
| Al-Seeb
| Al-Seeb
|  Emad Dahbour (Dec 2014–)
| Al-Seeb Stadium
| 14,000
|-
| Al-Shabab
| Barka
|  Waleed Zaid Al-Saadi (April 2015–)
| Al-Seeb Stadium
| 14,000
|-
| Al-Suwaiq
| Al-Suwaiq
|  Abderrazak Khairi (Nov 2014–)
| Al-Seeb Stadium
| 14,000
|-
| Bowsher
| Bowsher
|  Željko Markov (Jan 2015–)
| Sultan Qaboos Sports Complex / Royal Oman Police Stadium
| 39,000 / 18,000
|-
| Dhofar
| Salalah
|  Grigore Sichitiu (Jan 2015–)
| Al-Saada Stadium / Salalah Sports Complex
| 12,000 / 8,000
|-
| Fanja
| Fanja
|  Abdulraheem Al-Hajri (Mar 2015–)
| Sultan Qaboos Sports Complex / Royal Oman Police Stadium / Al-Seeb Stadium
| 14,000
|-
| Saham
| Saham
|  Branko Smiljanić (Nov 2014–)
| Sohar Regional Sports Complex
| 19,000
|-
| Sohar
| Sohar
|  Thair Adnan (Apr 2015–)
| Sohar Regional Sports Complex
| 19,000
|-
| Sur
| Sur
|  Youssef Al-Rafaly (Jan 2015–)
| Sur Sports Complex
| 8,000

References

 
Oman
Football clubs
Football clubs